Joseph Gagnier (5 April 1854 – 9 April 1919) was a Canadian clarinetist and the father of an important Canadian family of musicians.

Life and career
Born in L'Ancienne-Lorette, Quebec, Gagnier moved to Montreal in 1874 after deciding to pursue a music career. In that city he studied the clarinet with Oscar Arnold and Jacques Vanpoucke. He was also a student of music theory with Joseph Geai and Ernest Lavigne.

Gagnier began his career performing in the orchestras of a variety of Montreal theatres during the late 1870s and 1880s. From 1890-1919 he was clarinetist at Sohmer Park. In the 1905-1906 season he, along with his son J.-J. Gagnier, became a bassoonist in J.-J. Goulet's Montreal Symphony Orchestra, following the ensemble's unsuccessful attempt to acquire two bassoonists among the city's other musicians. He continued to play with that orchestra as a clarinetist up into the latter years of his life. He died in Montreal in 1919.

Gagnier was the father of 27 children. He taught music and a variety of instruments to most of them, "thus forming a veritable Gagnier orchestra". Many of his children became notable musicians, including  Armand Gagnier, Ernest Gagnier, Guillaume Gagnier, J.-J. Gagnier, Lucien Gagnier, Réal Gagnier, and René Gagnier. Several of his grandchildren became notable musicians, including Claire Gagnier, Ève Gagnier, Gérald Gagnier, and Roland Gagnier.

References

1854 births
1919 deaths
Canadian classical bassoonists
Canadian clarinetists
Canadian music educators
19th-century classical musicians